Colobotheini is a tribe of longhorn beetles of the subfamily Lamiinae.

Taxonomy
The tribe Colobotheini contains the following genera:

 Apechtes
 Carneades
 Carterica
 Cathexis
 Colobothea
 Colobothina
 Hilobothea
 Nodubothea
 Priscilla
 Sangaris
 Sparna
 Sympleurotis

References